The Death of Peace of Mind (stylised in all caps) is the third studio album by American rock band Bad Omens, released on February 25, 2022, through Sumerian Records. The band produced the album themselves, while mixing and mastering was done by Zakk Cervini. The album cover was shot by photographer Oswaldo Cepeda.

Musical style
The band made use of synths and electronic elements to produce a different sound to their previous albums, with Charlie Hill of Ghost Cult Magazine describing the closing track on the album, "Miracle", saying: "With dense, glitchy synths and bass taking the front seat, Sebastian follows with screaming vocals as the whole song distorts to a thunderous breakdown climax." Reviewer Simon K. said on Sputnik Music: "the production is punchy and has a dystopian cyberpunk-ish feel to it."

Release
On November 10, 2021, Bad Omens released the single, "The Death of Peace of Mind", and announced their third studio album of the same name would be released on February 25 2022.

Reception

The album has received generally positive reviews, with Paul Brown of Wall of Sound saying that "Bad Omens have more than proved themselves and their worth with The Death of Peace of Mind." Dan Stapleton of Rock'N'Load Magazine applauded the band and the album, saying "Bad Omens have created a phenomenal album here that is fresh enough to stand out against the rest of their genre while still being familiar enough to be easily accessible."

Track listing
All tracks are written and produced by Noah Sebastian and Joakim Karlsson, except where noted.

Tracks 1, 4, 12, and 14 are stylized in all caps
Tracks 10, 11, and 13 are stylized in sentence case
"Bad Decisions" is stylized in all lowercase
"IDWT$" stands for "I Don't Want the Money"

Personnel
Bad Omens
Noah Sebastian – vocals
Joakim Karlsson – guitar, vocals
Nicholas Ruffilo – bass, guitar
Nick Folio - drums

Production
Zakk Cervini – mixing, mastering

Charts

References

External links
The Death of Peace of Mind on Bandcamp

2022 albums
Sumerian Records albums